The 1932 Simmons Cowboys football team represented Simmons University—now known as Hardin–Simmons University—as a member of the Texas Conference during 1932 college football season. Led by Les Cranfill in his third season as head coach, the team went 4–5–1 overall, tying for third place in the Texas Conference with a mark of 1–2–1.

Schedule

References

Simmons
Hardin–Simmons Cowboys football seasons
Simmons Cowboys football